This article is about the demographic features of the population of Macau, including population density, ethnicity, education level, health of the populace, economic status, religious affiliations and other aspects of the population.

Macau's population is 95% Chinese, primarily Cantonese and some Hakka, both from nearby Guangdong Province. The majority of the remainder are of Portuguese or mixed Chinese-Portuguese ancestry. Some Japanese, including descendants of Japanese Catholics who were expelled by shōguns, also live in Macau.

The official languages are Portuguese and Cantonese Chinese. The residents commonly (85.7%) speak Cantonese, Mandarin is spoken by 3.2% at home, about 40% are able to communicate in standard Mandarin. English and Portuguese are spoken as a first language by 1.5% and 0.6% respectively, while English is widely taught as a second language. The other popular topolect is Hokkien (Min Nan), spoken by a small percentage of the population. The creole Macanese language (Patuá or Macaista Chapado) is almost extinct.

Vital statistics
The following are data on vital statistics.

Current vital statistics

Structure of the population  

Population Estimates by Sex and Age Group (01.VII.2020):

Life expectancy at birth 
Macao is the territory with the world's second highest life expectancy behind Hong Kong.

Source: UN World Population Prospects

Ethnic groups
The following are information on ethnicity and nationalities based on data from the Statistics and Census Service.

Place of birth
Immigration is an essential component of the population. Results of the 2011 Population Census indicated that 326,376 (59.1% of the total population) were born outside Macau, an increase of 3.0 percentage points over the last ten years. Analysed by place of birth, 255,186 (46.2%) were born in Mainland China, down by 1.2 percentage points from 2001.  226,127 (40.9%) were born in Macau, 19,355 (3.5%) in Hong Kong and 1,835 (0.3%) in Portugal. There were more persons born in other countries or territories as the number of non-resident workers increased. Among them, 14,544 were born in the Philippines, 7,199 in Vietnam and 6,269 in Indonesia, altogether taking up 5.1% of the total population. 1,942 were born in Europe other than Portugal, 2,252 in Americas, 959 in Africa and 672 in Oceania. Analysed by age group, 85.2% of the youth population (aged 0–14) were born in Macau, and 62.9% of those aged 35 and above were born in Mainland China.

 35,578 people in Macau were originally from Fujian province in Mainland China, making up about 25% of the Mainland China-born people. The number of Fujianese in Macau increased after the 1999 handover.

Nationality
Analysed by nationality, 509,788 (92.3% of the total population) were of Chinese nationality, down by 2.9 percentage points from the 2001 Census; meanwhile, only 0.9% was of Portuguese nationality, a decrease of 1.1 percentage points. These figures can be misleading, because more than a 100,000 people in Macau are holders of a Portuguese passport, making them in effect Portuguese citizens. Over the last ten years, diversity of the various components of the population is enhanced as economic development has drawn people to invest, work or study in Macau; consequently, 37,695 (6.8%) were of other nationalities, up by 4.0 percentage points, with 2.7% being Filipinos.
Macau is a Chinese community and those of Chinese ethnicity totaled 510,383, an increase of 94,030 over the past ten years; however, its proportion to the total population decreased by 3.3 percentage points to 92.4%. Those of wholly or partly Portuguese ethnicity totaled 8,106, up slightly by 333 compared with 2001; its proportion to the total decreased by 0.3 percentage point to 1.5%.

CIA World Factbook demographic statistics 

The following demographic statistics are from the CIA World Factbook, unless otherwise indicated.

Ethnic group
 Chinese 92.4%, other 7.6% (includes Macanese – mixed Portuguese and Asian ancestry) (2011 census)

Population
 624,000 (2014 Qtr2 est.)

Male and Female pattern
 Male: 307,200 (2014 Qtr2 est.)
 Female: 316,800 (2014 Qtr2 est.)

Age structure
 below age 15: 76,305 15.63%
 age 20–29: 82,547 16.91%
 age 30–39: 70,965 14.54%
 age 40–49: 91,438 18.73%
 age 49 or above: 40,349 8.27%

Infant mortality rate
 4.35 deaths/1,000 live births (2006 est.)

Total fertility rate
 0.91 children born/woman (2010 est.) The lowest fertility rate in the world after Taiwan.

Nationality
 noun: Macau
 adjective: Macanese

Religions

 30% Shenism, 10% Buddhism or Taoism, 5% Christianity, 50% not declaring religious affiliation, 10% others (2009). Another survey conducted between 2005, 2007 and 2009 has found that 30% of the population follows folk faiths, 10% are adherents of Buddhism or Taoism, 5% are Christians, and the remaining part do not declare religious adherence.

Languages

 Portuguese and Chinese are official languages. The Chinese standard (Cantonese or Mandarin) is not specified in the law.

Literacy
 definition: age 15 and over can read and write
 total population: 94.5%
 male: 97.2%
 female: 92% (2003 est.)

Immigration and crime
 Persons authorized to reside in Macau: total: 50,159 (by the end of 2005)
 Non-resident workers authorized to enter Macau: total: 39,411 (by the end of 2005)
 Legal immigrants from Mainland China: 1,133 (Qtr1 2006) 947 (Qtr2 2006)
 No. of criminal cases: 2,634 (Qtr1 2006) 2,708 (Qtr2 2006)

Health
 No. of residents per doctor (excluding dentists): 473
 No. of residents per nurse: 430
 No. of residents per hospital bed: 496

Main causes of death
 Diseases of the circulatory system: 518 cases, 32.1%
 Neoplasm: 455 cases, 28.2%
 Diseases of the respiratory system: 267, cases 16.5%

See also
Macau people

References

External links 
 Demographic Statistics – Statistics and Census Service